Manx Maid may refer to two ships of the Isle  of Man Steam Packet Company:
 
 SS Manx Maid (1962)